Gribler Creek is a stream in Bollinger and
Wayne counties in the U.S. state of Missouri. It is a tributary of McGee Creek.

Variant names were "Gribbler Creek" and "Grubbler Creek". The creek has the name of Alvin and John Gribbler, original owners of the site.

See also
List of rivers of Missouri

References

Rivers of Bollinger County, Missouri
Rivers of Wayne County, Missouri
Rivers of Missouri